Anupam Shobhakar is an Indian musician, composer, instrumentalist, record producer, and classically trained sarodist currently living in Brooklyn, New York. He has released three world fusion albums, and one classical Indian music album. He has performed live around the world at various venues and for charitable causes.  Shobhakar's track "Water" made it to the first round of the Grammy Awards.

Early life

Musical influences
Shobhakar was born in the east Indian city of Kolkata (Calcutta), but was raised in India's financial capital city of Bombay. Although Shobhakar's parents are not musicians, they often played classical Indian records at home, which had an influence on Shobhakar. His grandfather, Shri Bhavani Shankar Shovakar, played sitar, tabla, and sang, hosting concerts at his residence.

Shobhakar's first brush with western music was listening to Led Zeppelin and Deep Purple, followed by Megadeth and Metallica. He was given a guitar, which he strung left-handed, and began practising, eventually forming a band named Dead Sea Scrolls, which played cover versions of songs by Megadeth, Joe Satriani, and Steve Vai. During this same time (before the age of thirteen), Shobhakar began experimenting with jazz and classical music.

Indian classical music and the sarod
In his early teens, Shobhakar began to listen to Indian classical music again – as he says, "What I was doing on the guitar was not enough to musically satisfy me. I heard a Shakti record...that re-ignited my interest in the deep melodic gravitas." Shobhakar experimented by crafting a fretless guitar but found that nothing could match the "microtonal subtleties of Indian Music" like the traditional sarod.

Shobhakar's first teacher was Suresh Vyas, who stressed practice and technical discipline. Shobhakar explains, "For three or four years it was only exercises – a lot of finger exercises, but no music. I got a little bit disillusioned, but that's okay: the philosophy behind it is, first you get your hands entirely ready, so that when the music comes to you, you don't have to worry about technique." The intense training process is known as "tayarri." He explains, "That word has been broadly translated as, like, 'technically great', but tayarri actually means 'to be ready'. To be ready when the creative thing comes to you, your fingers, your mind, your body, and your soul must be exactly in place for you to execute it."

Shobhakar met Ustad Aashish Khan briefly when he came to do a concert in Bombay and stayed at Shobhakar's apartment. Shobhakar states that he was "blown away by Khan's command over the sarod," and has been studying with him ever since. Shobhakar lists Khan, and his father, Ustad Allaudin Khan (guru to Ravi Shankar and Ali Akbar Khan), as his main playing style influences: "Slightly aggressive in approach, but never at the cost of the melodic charm."

Musical career
Shobhakar was recognised for his talents as an Indian classical music performer by the Priyadarshni Academy, who awarded him the Best Young Artist Award. Shobhakar's current focus is world fusion and jazz fusion.

First album
Shobhakar recorded his first album Mysterious Awakening, in 2004.  He handled every aspect of production on the record, including tracking the guitars with a "goose neck internet chat mic." Shobhakar describes the sound of the music on the album as "the best of both worlds."  He explains, "Most Indian musicians do not understand harmony as it's not a part of the musical system — it's a melodic and rhythmic tradition — whereas a lot of western music is based on harmony." The album was released by Saregama HMV.

World fusion
Shobhakar's album was his first major contribution to world fusion, something he feels very passionately about. He says, "Apart from being a traditional concert sarodist, I want to really explore world music, and I've been wanting to do that for a while. I've been pretty much producing on my own: making all the music, adding all the MIDI instrumentation in my studio at home. But here it's better, because I can meet a lot of different musicians, a lot of different, diverse people."

Shobhakar released a subsequent world fusion album, Wine of the Mystic in 2005. In 2009, he released an Indian classical album, Dream Theory.

In 2013, Shobhakar and American guitarist Joel Harrison released Leave the Door Open (Whirlwind Recordings).

International performer
Shobhakar has toured internationally, playing at major music festivals such as Canada's Vancouver Folk Festival, MTV's Independence Rock Festival in India, Oman's Muscat Festival, and Italy's Roma Rock. Shobhakar has also dedicated his talents to charitable events such as YWCA India's Concert for Peace, raising money for the survivors of the Gujarat earthquake.

Shobhakar has collaborated and played with musicians from all over the globe, including Joel Harrison, Dan Weiss, World Fusion Orchestra, Alessandro Gandola, Ivan Tucakov, Gordon Gridna, Heather Schmid, Rich Balmer, Juan de Marias, Joel Harrison.

Awards and recognition
 Received title, “Surmani” (Jewel of Melody), awarded by Sursingar Samsad
 Felicitated by the Indian Armed Forces
 Awarded "Best Young Artist" by Priyadarshni Academy

Major concert performances

International

Domestic (India)

Voluntary work
 Concert for Peace by YWCA – After Gujarat earthquake, India, 2008.
 Designed the Module to Teach Underprivileged Tribal Children in India, 2008.

References

External links
Official Anumpam Shobhakar Website
"Exploration on a new scale," Straight.com Article
Shobhakar live performance at Young String Masters of India
NYC Radio Live! performance with Aashish Khan

Sarod players
Living people
1979 births
Musicians from Mumbai
Indian male classical musicians
Indian classical composers
Indian emigrants to the United States
World music musicians